Indiana's 5th congressional district is a congressional district in the U.S. state of Indiana that takes the north side of Indianapolis as well as its eastern and northern suburbs, including Marion, Carmel, Anderson, Noblesville, Fishers, and parts of Kokomo. This suburban district is predominantly white and is the wealthiest congressional district in Indiana, per median income.

The district is currently represented by Republican Victoria Spartz.

Demographics 
According to the APM Research Lab's Voter Profile Tools (featuring the U.S. Census Bureau's 2019 American Community Survey), the district contained about 585,000 potential voters (citizens, age 18+). Of these, 84% are White and 8% are Black. Immigrants make up 4% of the district's potential voters. Median income among households (with one or more potential voter) in the district is about $76,700, while 7% of households live below the poverty line. As for the educational attainment of potential voters in the district, 45% hold a bachelor's or higher degree.

Composition

Largest cities
Largest cities in the, listing every city that had at least 10,000 inhabitants as of the 2020 census.

 Carmel - 100,777
 Fishers - 98,977
 Muncie - 65,194
 Noblesville - 64,668
 Kokomo - 59,604
 Anderson - 56,129
 Westfield - 46,410
 Marion - 29,948
 Yorktown - 11,548

As of 2022, Indiana's 5th congressional district is located in central Indiana. It includes Delaware, Grant, Hamilton, Howard, Madison, and Tipton Counties.

Recent election results from statewide races

List of members representing the district

Election results

2002

2004

2006

2008

2010

2012

2014

2016

2018

2020

See also

Indiana's congressional districts
List of United States congressional districts

References

External links

Congressional Biographical Directory of the United States 1774–present

05

Marion County, Indiana
Government of Indianapolis
1833 establishments in Indiana
Constituencies established in 1833